Mucuchíes is a town in the Rangel Municipality of Mérida State, Venezuela. It is at an altitude of 2,983 meters and has a cool climate, with an average temperature of 11 °C. The town was founded by Bartolomé Gil Naranjo in 1586.

Festivals
Patron saint festivities are held during the month of December, with their patron saints St. Lucia and St. Benedict the Moor.

Geography

Climate
Köppen-Geiger climate classification system classifies its climate as subtropical highland (Cfb).

References

Populated places in Mérida (state)